William Niven (1850–1937), was a Scottish-American mineralogist and archeologist.

William Niven may also refer to:

William Davidson Niven (1842–1917), British mathematician and electrical engineer
William Dickie Niven (1879–1965), professor of ecclesiastical history
William E. G. Niven, in 83rd Regiment of Foot (Royal Glasgow Volunteers) and father of David Niven
Bill Niven, historian, see Naked Among Wolves